Lucy Punch (born 30 December 1977) is a British actress. She has appeared in the films Ella Enchanted, Hot Fuzz, You Will Meet a Tall Dark Stranger, Dinner for Schmucks, and Into the Woods. She is also known for her role as Amy in Bad Teacher, Amanda in the BBC series Motherland and Esmé Squalor in the Netflix series A Series of Unfortunate Events.

Early life
Punch was born on 30 December 1977 in Hammersmith, London, the daughter of Johanna and Michael Punch, who ran a market research company. She was educated privately at Godolphin and Latymer School in Hammersmith, London. She performed with the National Youth Theatre from 1993 to 1997, and began a course at University College London before dropping out to become an actress.

Career

Punch made her acting debut in a 1998 episode of The New Adventures of Robin Hood. Her other TV credits include the naive daughter of Alison Steadman's character in the short-lived series Let Them Eat Cake which starred French and Saunders. She starred as a football player in the children's TV show Renford Rejects, and played the role of the victim Melissa Townsend in the 19th episode of Midsomer Murders.

In 2000, Punch appeared in the film Greenfingers. She made her stage debut as Elaine in Terry Johnson's West End adaptation of The Graduate. She has worked at the Royal Court and Bush theatres, both in London.

In 2004, Punch played the receptionist Elaine Denham in Doc Martin. She left the television show The Class after appearing in 11 of the first 12 episodes. In 2006, she won the Best Actress award at the Monaco International Film Festival for her performance in Are You Ready For Love? She played the murder victim and actress Eve Draper in Edgar Wright's 2007 film Hot Fuzz.

Punch starred in Woody Allen's 2010 film You Will Meet a Tall Dark Stranger. In August 2010, she appeared in BBC Two's three part police comedy-drama Vexed. In 2011, Punch appeared in Bad Teacher, portraying the sanctimonious school teacher Amy Squirrel.

Punch was cast as Deena Pilgrim, the female lead in the TV pilot Powers, but the role was recast. 

From 2016, Punch played Amanda, leader of the "Alpha mums", in the BBC comedy series Motherland. 

In 2017, Punch was cast in the role of Esmé Squalor in the second season of the Netflix comedy drama series A Series of Unfortunate Events, a role that continued through the show's third and final season.

In December 2022, Punch reprised her role of Amanda in the Motherland Christmas special.

Personal life
Punch gave birth to her first child, a son, in July 2015.

Filmography

Film

Television

Stage

References

External links 

 

1977 births
Living people
20th-century English actresses
21st-century English actresses
Actresses from London
British expatriate actresses in the United States
English film actresses
English radio actresses
English stage actresses
English television actresses
National Youth Theatre members
People educated at Godolphin and Latymer School
People from Hammersmith